Baron Erskine, of Restormel Castle in the County of Cornwall, is a title in the Peerage of the United Kingdom, since 1960 a subsidiary title of the earldom of Buchan. It was created on 10 February 1806 for the Honourable Thomas Erskine on his appointment as Lord High Chancellor of Great Britain, a post he held until the following year. He was the third and youngest son of Henry Erskine, 10th Earl of Buchan (see Earl of Buchan for earlier history of the family). Lord Erskine was succeeded by his eldest son, the second Baron. He was a diplomat. His two eldest sons, the third and fourth Barons, succeeded successively. The latter was succeeded by his son, the fifth Baron. He was a Deputy Lieutenant of Northamptonshire. His grandson, the seventh Baron, succeeded in the earldom of Buchan in 1960 on the death of his kinsman, the fifteenth Earl. The two titles have remained united since.

Several other members of this branch of the Erskine family may also be mentioned. The Very Reverend the Honourable Henry David Erskine (1786–1859), second son of the first Baron, was Dean of Ripon. The Honourable Thomas Erskine (1788–1870), third son of the first Baron, was a Judge of the Court of Common Pleas. The Honourable Esmé Stuart Erskine (1789–1817), fought at the Battle of Waterloo where he lost an arm. The Honourable Edward Erskine, fourth son of the second Baron, was a diplomat and served as Envoy Extraordinary and Minister Plenipotentiary to Greece and to Sweden. James Erskine (1821–1904), fourth son of the second Baron, was created Graf Erskine by Ludwig II of Bavaria.

Barons Erskine (1806)

Thomas Erskine, 1st Baron Erskine (1749/50–1823)
David Montagu Erskine, 2nd Baron Erskine (1777–1855)
Thomas Americus Erskine, 3rd Baron Erskine (1802–1877)
John Cadwallader Erskine, 4th Baron Erskine (1804–1882)
William Macnaghten Erskine, 5th Baron Erskine (1841–1913)
Montagu Erskine, 6th Baron Erskine (1865–1957)
Donald Cardross Flower Erskine, 16th Earl of Buchan, 7th Baron Erskine (1899–1984)

For further Barons Erskine, see Earl of Buchan.

References

Sources

External links

Baron
Noble titles created in 1806
Noble titles created for UK MPs
Baronies in the Peerage of the United Kingdom
Peerages created for the Lord High Chancellor of Great Britain